Thomas & Friends is a children's television series about the engines and other characters on the railways of the Island of Sodor, and is based on The Railway Series books written by the Reverend W. Awdry. 

This article lists and details episodes from the twenty-second series of the show, which began airing on 3 September 2018 in the UK, and on 17 September 2018 in the US. 

Retitled as Thomas & Friends: Big World, Big Adventures!, Series 22 saw the first major changes since the show switched to full CGI animation in the thirteenth series. The episodes kept their eleven-minute-long runtime, but were now divided into seven minute-long stories, with an additional four minutes reserved for a variety of segments, such as sing-along karaoke songs and music videos, or Thomas talking directly with the audience about lessons learned during a particular episode.

Production
Note: Production for series 22 began in fall of 2017. Clips of the series were released in October of that year, almost a year before its premiere on television.

Series 22 introduced new characters Nia and Rebecca and also retired the narration, with Thomas now talking directly to the audience about the day's episode and during the learning segments. In addition, the show had a brand new theme song.
	
The series is set directly after the events of the Big World! Big Adventures! movie. Episodes are split into two halves; the first half sees Thomas travelling around the world, while the second half takes place back on the Island of Sodor. The series was released on Netflix, Amazon Prime Video, and Hulu in the fall of 2018.

Voice cast

The following voice actors were listed in the closing credits for the series:
 Joseph May as Thomas (US)
 John Hasler as Thomas (UK)
 Chipo Chung
 Dona Adwera
 Teresa Gallagher
 Siu-See Hung
 Dan Li
 Windson Liong
 Keith Wickham
The following are also considered main characters but were not listed in the credits:
 Yvonne Grundy voices Nia, an orange steam train from Kenya. She is based on the East African Railways’ ED1 class steam train.
 Rachael Miller voices Rebecca, a yellow steam train from the Mainland Britain. Her design is based on a Southern Railway West Country 4-6-2 Pacific steam train .

Episodes

Notes

References

2018 American television seasons
2019 American television seasons
Thomas & Friends seasons
2018 British television seasons
2019 British television seasons